Balassagyarmat is a district in north-western part of Nógrád County. Balassagyarmat is also the name of the town where the district seat is found. The district is located in the Northern Hungary Statistical Region.

Geography 
Balassagyarmat District borders with the Slovakian regions of Nitra and Banská Bystrica to the north, Szécsény District and Pásztó District to the east, Vác District (Pest County) to the south, Rétság District to the southwest, Szob District (Pest County) to the west. The number of the inhabited places in Balassagyarmat District is 29.

Municipalities 
The district has 1 town and 28 villages.
(ordered by population, as of 1 January 2013)

The bolded municipality is the city.

Demographics

In 2011, it had a population of 40,326 and the population density was 76/km².

Ethnicity
Besides the Hungarian majority, the main minorities are the Roma (approx. 2,000), Slovak (400) and German (100).

Total population (2011 census): 40,326
Ethnic groups (2011 census): Identified themselves: 37,603 persons:
Hungarians: 34,861 (93.70%)
Gypsies: 1,932 (5.19%)
Slovaks: 380 (1.02%)
Others and indefinable: 430 (1.14%)
Approx. 2,500 persons in Balassagyarmat District did not declare their ethnic group at the 2011 census.

Religion
Religious adherence in the county according to 2011 census:

Catholic – 24,829 (Roman Catholic – 24,781; Greek Catholic – 45);
Evangelical – 2,561; 
Reformed – 681; 
other religions – 610; 
Non-religious – 2,049; 
Atheism – 335;
Undeclared – 9,261.

Gallery

See also
List of cities and towns of Hungary

References

External links
 Postal codes of the Balassagyarmat District

Districts in Nógrád County